Hunter's Blood is a 1986 action thriller film directed by Robert C. Hughes, produced by Myrl A. Schriebman and starring Sam Bottoms, Kim Delaney, Clu Gulager, Ken Swofford and Joey Travolta.

Plot
Five men from the city decide to take a little trip to the woods and have some fun and hunting. Things get complicated later on when they encounter a pack of maniacal deer hunters who turn them in to prey.

Cast
Sam Bottoms as David Rand 
Kim Delaney as Melanie
Clu Gulager as Mason Rand
Ken Swofford as Al Coleman
Joey Travolta as Marty Adler
Mayf Nutter as Ralph Coleman
Lee de Broux as Red Beard
Bruce Glover as One Eye
Billy Drago as Snake
Mickey Jones as Wash Pot
Charles Cyphers as Woody
Bryan Rasmussen as Purty Boy
Joe Verroca as Ants
David DeShay as Tull
Mike Muscat as Bubba 
Billy Bob Thornton as Billy Bob

References

External links 
 
 

1980s adventure films
1980s slasher films
1986 action thriller films
1986 films
1986 horror films
Adventure horror films
American action horror films
American action thriller films
American horror thriller films
American slasher films
Backwoods slasher films
Films set in forests
1980s English-language films
1980s American films